The Table tennis competition in the 2009 Summer Universiade were held in Belgrade, Serbia.

Medal overview

Medal table

External links

2009 Summer Universiade
Universiade
2009